Richard Gennys Fanshawe (22 June 1906 – 14 April 1988) was a British horse rider who competed in the 1936 Summer Olympics.

He was born at Rathmore, Naas, Kildare, third son of Lieutenant-General Edward Arthur Fanshawe (1859–1952), K.C.B., of the Royal Artillery, and Frances Rose, daughter of Sir James Macaulay Higginson, K.C.B., Governor of British Mauritius from 1851 to 1857, formerly Governor of Antigua 1847 to 1850. His middle name, 'Gennys', derived from the marriage on 6 December 1769 of Captain Robert Fanshawe, R.N. to Christiana, daughter of John Gennys, of Whitleigh Hall, Devon, and had been given to members of the Fanshawe family including his grand-uncle Admiral Edward Gennys Fanshawe (1814-1906), Commander-in-Chief, Portsmouth.

Fanshawe had a military career in the cavalry; he attained the rank of Major in the 16th/5th Lancers.

In 1936 he and his horse Bowie Knife won the bronze medal as part of the British eventing team, after finishing 26th in the individual eventing competition.

Fanshawe married firstly, in 1932 (divorced 1961), Ruth Violet Mary, daughter of Sir Walter Randolph FitzRoy Farquhar, 5th Baronet, and maternal granddaughter of Thomas Bateson, 1st Baron Deramore. They had two sons, David (1933–2012), a Colonel in the Grenadier Guards, and Brian (1936–2019), who served as a captain in the 9th/12th Royal Lancers; "an exceptional horseman", he was also Master of the Cottesmore Hunt. In 1963 Fanshawe married secondly Araby Diana, daughter of Philip Ransom; their son, Richard, was born in 1964. Fanshawe died at Cheltenham.

References

External links
Richard Fanshawe's profile at Sports Reference.com

1906 births
1988 deaths
British event riders
Olympic equestrians of Great Britain
British male equestrians
Equestrians at the 1936 Summer Olympics
Olympic bronze medallists for Great Britain
Olympic medalists in equestrian
Medalists at the 1936 Summer Olympics
16th/5th The Queen's Royal Lancers officers
20th-century British Army personnel